Cow Creek is a  tributary of Jordan Creek in the U.S. state of Oregon. Cow Creek has a  watershed.

See also
List of rivers of Oregon
List of longest streams of Oregon
List of rivers of Idaho
List of longest streams of Idaho

References

Rivers of Oregon
Rivers of Malheur County, Oregon
Rivers of Owyhee County, Idaho
Rivers of Idaho